Oliver Schaller (born 15 August 1994) is a Swiss badminton player. He competed at the 2015 and 2019 European Games. Schaller won his first international title at the 2016 Swiss International in the mixed doubles event partnered with Céline Burkart.

Achievements

BWF International Challenge/Series (2 titles, 2 runners-up) 
Men's doubles

Mixed doubles

  BWF International Challenge tournament
  BWF International Series tournament
  BWF Future Series tournament

References

External links 
 

1994 births
Living people
People from Fribourg
Swiss male badminton players
Badminton players at the 2015 European Games
Badminton players at the 2019 European Games
European Games competitors for Switzerland
Sportspeople from the canton of Fribourg